Statistics of J. League Cup, officially the 2002 J.League Yamazaki Nabisco Cup, in the 2002 season.

Overview
It was contested by 16 teams, and Kashima Antlers won the championship.

Results

Group A

Group B

Group C

Group D

Quarterfinals

Semifinals

Final

Kashima Antlers won the championship.

References
rsssf
 J. League

J.League Cup
Lea